Jean Marie Julien Balland (26 July 1934 in Bué, Cher, France – 1 March 1998 in Lyon) was a Catholic Cardinal and Archbishop of Lyon.

Early life
He entered the seminary and later attended the Pontifical Gregorian University in Rome where he earned a licentiate in philosophy in 1956, and in theology. He later attended the Sorbonne University in Paris where he graduated with doctorates in philosophy and theology. He was ordained on 3 September 1961.

After his ordination he was a faculty member of the seminary where he was ordained from 1962 to 1968. He was transferred, teaching at Tours from 1967 to 1973.

Episcopate
Pope John Paul II appointed him as Bishop of Dijon on 6 November 1982.  He was transferred to the Metropolitan see of Reims in 1988.  He was appointed as the Archbishop of Lyon on 27 May 1995. Archbishop Balland was created and proclaimed Cardinal-Priest in the consistory of 21 February 1998 with the titular church of San Pietro in Vincoli.

He died in 1998, eight days after becoming a cardinal.

References

1934 births
1998 deaths
People from Cher (department)
20th-century French cardinals
French expatriates in Italy
Bishops of Dijon
Archbishops of Lyon
Archbishops of Reims
Pontifical Gregorian University alumni
Cardinals created by Pope John Paul II